West Wickham railway station serves West Wickham in the London Borough of Bromley. It is located in south east London and is in Travelcard Zone 5.

The station is operated by Southeastern and is served by Southeastern Hayes line trains.

History

Early Years 1882–1923
West Wickham was built when the branch from the Mid-Kent Railway at Elmers End to Hayes was built and opened on 29 May 1882.

The branch was built by the West Wickham & Hayes Railway, but was sold to the South Eastern Railway in 1881 for £162,000. Colonel John Farnaby, Lord of the Manor of West Wickham, was a leading promoter. Initially the 13 weekday and four Sunday services operated as far as Elmers End where they connected with Addiscombe to London trains. West Wickham was the second station located on the branch located a quarter of a mile north of Wickham Green (963 inhabitants).

On opening the station was provided with two platforms and the station building was located on the up side. The station building was built in the SER clapboard style with a slate roof and a goods yard was provided at the London end on the down side. On the opposite side of the line a signal box was provided at the east (London) end of the station. The station was also provided with two end loading docks which would have been used for the horse-drawn carriages of the gentry.

Initially the line was of questionable commercial value as the area was largely rural although it was an attractive location for Londoners wishing to escape to the countryside and with this in mind The Railway Hotel was opened in 1882.

In 1898 the South Eastern Railway and the London Chatham and Dover Railway agreed to work as one railway company under the name of the South Eastern and Chatham Railway and thus West Wickham became a SE&CR station.

By 1912 services had increased to 15 each way but only two of these actually operated through to London the rest terminating at Elmers End. In 1909 however the 8:37 a.m. Hayes - Charing Cross service was formed of Continental boat train stock where on arrival it was used to work the 10:00 a.m. Charing Cross- Folkestone boat train.

Southern Railway (1923–1947)
Following the Railways Act 1921 (also known as the Grouping Act), West Wickham became a Southern Railway station on 1 January 1923.

The line was electrified with limited electric services commencing on 21 September 1925 before a full electric service started operation on 28 February 1926. Following the electrification house building started to increase in the area and as a result so did patronage of the station. In 1925, 336 season tickets were sold but nine years later this had increased to 18,711. Similarly, 46,985 tickets were issued in 1925 but in 1934 that had risen to 251,024 tickets per year.

On 10 May 1941, during the Second World War, a German bomb exploded between the two platforms severely damaging the SER structures.

British Railways (1948–1994)
On 1 January 1948 following nationalisation of the railways West Wickham became part of British Railways Southern Region. Seventeen years after the original buildings had been damaged by the bomb new brick buildings and platform canopies were provided. Prior to the war in 1935 West Wickham had been the busiest station on the branch but in the 1950s Hayes became busier.
The goods yard continued to be busy throughout the 1950s with 11,000 tons of solid fuel being recorded in 1958. However, the goods yard was closed on 2 September 1963.

In connection with the introduction of colour light signalling on the branch the signal box was closed on 27 September 1975 and the signals are now controlled form London Bridge Signalling Centre.

Upon sectorisation in 1982, three passenger sectors were created: InterCity, operating principal express services; and London & South East (renamed Network SouthEast in 1986) who operated commuter services in the London area.

The privatisation era (1994-Present Day)
Following privatisation of British Rail on 1 April 1994 the infrastructure at West Wickham station became the responsibility of Railtrack whilst a business unit operated the train services. On 13 October 1996 operation of the passenger services passed to Connex South Eastern who were originally due to run the franchise until 2011.

Following a number of accidents and financial issues Railtrack plc was sold to Network Rail on 3 October 2002 who became responsible for the infrastructure.

On 27 June 2003 the Strategic Rail Authority decided to strip Connex of the franchise citing poor financial management and run the franchise itself. Connex South Eastern continued to operate the franchise until 8 November 2003 with the services transferring to the Strategic Rail Authority's South Eastern Trains subsidiary the following day.

On 30 November 2005 the Department for Transport awarded Govia the Integrated Kent franchise. The services operated by South Eastern Trains transferred to Southeastern on 1 April 2006.

On 21 January 2016, Transport for London announced that in 2018, they will take over the London suburban parts of the Southeastern franchise, rebranding the routes as London Overground from that point. However, in the end this did not occur, and at present the station remains under the control of Southeastern.

Service 

The typical off-peak service in trains per hour is:
 4 tph to 

On Sundays, the station is served by a half-hourly service between Hayes and London Charing Cross via Lewisham.

Connections
London Bus routes 194 and 352 serve the station.

References

External links 

Railway stations in the London Borough of Bromley
Former South Eastern Railway (UK) stations
Railway stations in Great Britain opened in 1882
Railway stations served by Southeastern